Stará Voda is a municipality and village in Cheb District in the Karlovy Vary Region of the Czech Republic. It has about 500 inhabitants.

Administrative parts
Villages of Sekerské Chalupy and Vysoká are administrative parts of Stará Voda.

Geography
The eastern part of the municipal territory with the village of Stará Voda lies in the Upper Palatine Forest Foothills, but most of the municipality lies in the Upper Palatine Forest.

References

Villages in Cheb District